James Orin Mote (January 27, 1922 – April 29, 2006) was a founding member of the Continuing Anglican movement. An alumnus of Canterbury College (Danville, Indiana) and Nashotah House Theological Seminary, he was consecrated in the Anglican Catholic Church. He was elected as the first bishop of the Diocese of the Holy Trinity in 1977, and consecrated on 28 January 1978 by Bishops Albert A. Chambers, Francisco Paktaghan, and Charles Doren, at Augustana Lutheran Church in Denver, Colorado.  He served as Bishop of the Diocese until 1994, when he resigned and retired to live initially in Florida, but later in Indiana.  He died on April 29, 2006, in Indianapolis.

References
New York Times obituary

1922 births
2006 deaths
20th-century Anglican bishops in the United States
21st-century Anglican bishops in the United States
Anglo-Catholic bishops
American Anglo-Catholics
American Continuing Anglican bishops